Noggin Cove is a local service district and designated place in the Canadian province of Newfoundland and Labrador. It is west of Carmanville on the south side of Hamilton Sound. It is said to be named after Noggin Island, about 5 km off its eastern point.

History
It is believed that the first settler in Noggin Cove was named Doyle from Tilting on Fogo Island, he lived on the western side for a few years before returning to Tilting. The 1857 Census of Newfoundland recorded a population of six, most likely the Doyle family, and they were all Roman Catholic. The next recorded family was Robert and Sarah Wheaton's family of 13, but they moved again in 1874. It was in the late 1870s before permanent settlement began in Noggin Cove. Most settlers came from Ochre Pit Cove, the first being Levi Pennell and Charles White. Other names include Parsons, Gillingham, Angells, Snow, and Whites. By 1884 the population was 46. In 1911 the population was recorded as 112. The main employers for people in Noggin Cove was the Labrador fishery, the cod fishery, summer fishery off the Wadham Islands, and later logging, sawmills and lobster fishing were important.

Church history
Almost all of the earliest permanent settlers were Methodist and since there was no church in Noggin Cove they went to the nearby community of Frederickton to attend the Methodist church. They was a school built in the early 20th century which they also used as a chapel. Noggin Cove came under the Carmanville Methodist Circuit in the 20th century.

Geography 
Noggin Cove is in Newfoundland within Subdivision L of Division No. 8.

Demographics 

Government 
Noggin Cove is a local service district (LSD) that is governed by a committee responsible for the provision of certain services to the community. The chair of the LSD committee is Gerald Gillingham.

See also 
List of communities in Newfoundland and Labrador
List of designated places in Newfoundland and Labrador
List of local service districts in Newfoundland and Labrador

References 

Populated coastal places in Canada
Designated places in Newfoundland and Labrador
Local service districts in Newfoundland and Labrador